Otradnoye (also spelt Otradny and Otradnoe) is a village in the Belgorodsky District of Belgorod Oblast, Russia. During the 2022 Russian invasion of Ukraine a single shell landed in the village. No damage occurred.

References 

Rural localities in Belgorodsky District